Pete Jolly (born Peter A. Ceragioli Jr., June 5, 1932 – November 6, 2004) was a two-time Grammy-nominated American West Coast jazz pianist and accordionist.  He is known for his performance of television themes and movie soundtracks.

Biography
Jolly began playing the accordion at age three and appeared on the radio program Hobby Lobby at the age of seven. He was raised in Phoenix, Arizona, a hotbed of jazz at the time. One of his best friends and collaborators in Phoenix was guitarist Howard Roberts, whom he met at the age of 13. Following Roberts to Los Angeles in 1952, he immediately began working with the best players on the West Coast jazz scene, including Shorty Rogers. He moved easily into studio and session work. Besides his performances as a pianist, he also played the accordion.

His composition "Little Bird" (a minor hit on Fred Astaire's Ava Records) was nominated for a Grammy Award in 1963, and he formed the Pete Jolly Trio in 1964. With the Trio and as a solo artist, he recorded several albums, including earning a Grammy nomination for Best Instrumental Jazz Performance – Small Group or Soloist with Small Group. One of the last albums was a collaboration—aptly entitled Collaboration—with Jan Lundgren, Chuck Berghofer, and Joe LaBarbera in 2000. His final album, It's a Cool Heat, was recorded in Phoenix in May 2004 shortly before his death. He worked with Buddy DeFranco, Art Pepper, and Red Norvo, and for many years with music arranger and director Ray Conniff and Herb Alpert, recording on Alpert's record label, A&M as both sideman and leader.

Jolly's music can be heard on television programs such as Get Smart, The Love Boat, I Spy, Mannix, M*A*S*H and Dallas, as well as hundreds of movie soundtracks. He recreated all of Bud Powell's playing with Charlie Parker for Clint Eastwood's biographical movie about Parker, Bird. By day, Jolly worked in the studios; by night, with his trio. He continued to perform with his trio in Los Angeles jazz clubs until shortly before being hospitalized in August 2004. His final public performance with his trio was in Reno, Nevada, and he said it was the best he had ever played. Active for nearly fifty years, the Pete Jolly Trio had only one bassist, Chuck Berghofer, and one drummer, Nick Martinis. Berghofer later said, "In all that time, Pete never once told me how to play or what to play."

Jolly died at the age of 72 in November 2004 in Pasadena, California, from complications of multiple myeloma.

Discography

As leader/co-leader

Compilations
Quartet, Quintet & Sextet (Fresh Sound, 1955–56)
Pete Jolly and Friends (VSOP, 1962–64)

As sideman
With Elmer Bernstein
 The Man with the Golden Arm (Decca, 1956)
With Kenny Burrell
Heritage (AudioSource, 1980)
With Buddy Collette
Porgy & Bess (Interlude 1957 [1959])
With Jerry Donato
It's a Cool Heat
With Joni James
 After Hours (MGM, 1962)
With J. J. Johnson
 Concepts in Blue (Pablo Today, 1981)
With Quincy Jones
 Roots (A&M, 1977)
With Johnny Mandel 
 I Want to Live (United Artists, 1958)
With Gerry Mulligan 
 I Want to Live (United Artists, 1958)
 If You Can't Beat 'Em, Join 'Em! (Limelight, 1965)
With Jack Nitzsche
Heart Beat (Soundtrack) (Capitol, 1980)
With Shorty Rogers
 Shorty Rogers and His Giants (RCA Victor, 1954 [1956])
 The Swinging Mr. Rogers (Atlantic, 1955)
 Martians Stay Home (Atlantic, 1955 [1980])
 Martians Come Back! (Atlantic, 1955 [1956])
 Way Up There (Atlantic, 1955 [1957])
 Shorty Rogers Plays Richard Rodgers (RCA Victor, 1957)
 Gigi in Jazz (RCA Victor, 1958)
 Chances Are It Swings (RCA Victor, 1958)
 The Wizard of Oz and Other Harold Arlen Songs (RCA Victor, 1959)
 Shorty Rogers Meets Tarzan (MGM, 1960)
 The Swingin' Nutcracker (RCA Victor, 1960)
 An Invisible Orchard (RCA Victor, 1961 [1997])
 The Fourth Dimension in Sound (Warner Bros., 1961)
 Bossa Nova (Reprise, 1962)
 Jazz Waltz (Reprise, 1962)
With Tom Waits
 One from the Heart (film) soundtrack (CBS, 1982)

References

External links
 

Space Age Musicmakers

1932 births
2004 deaths
American jazz pianists
American male pianists
American television composers
Deaths from cancer in California
Cool jazz keyboardists
Musicians from New Haven, Connecticut
West Coast jazz pianists
Deaths from multiple myeloma
20th-century American pianists
20th-century American composers
Jazz musicians from Connecticut
20th-century American male musicians
American male jazz musicians
Äva Records artists